Willis C. Wyman  (December 19, 1859 – January 10, 1942) was a professional baseball outfielder. He played one season for the Kansas City Cowboys and Chicago Browns in the Union Association in 1884.

External links

Major League Baseball outfielders
Chicago Browns/Pittsburgh Stogies players
Kansas City Cowboys (UA) players
Lynn (minor league baseball) players
Baseball players from Maine
19th-century baseball players
1859 births
1942 deaths